Dorvilleidae is a family of polychaetes belonging to the order Eunicida.

Genera

Genera:
 Anchidorvillea Hilbig & Blake, 1991
 Apodotrocha Westheide & Riser, 1983
 Apophryotrocha Jumars, 1974

References

Polychaetes